Nicholas Skerrett (died 1583) was a Roman Catholic clergyman who was Archbishop of Tuam in Ireland from 1580 to 1583.

A graduate of the Collegium Germanicum in Rome, he was appointed Archbishop of Tuam on 17 October 1580. On his arrival in Ireland, he was thrown into prison, but managed to escape and made his way to Spain. He eventually took refuge in Lisbon, Portugal, where he died in February 1583 and was buried in the church of São Roque.

References

1583 deaths
16th-century Roman Catholic archbishops in Ireland
Christian clergy from County Galway
Irish expatriates in Italy
Irish expatriates in Spain
Irish expatriates in Portugal
Roman Catholic archbishops of Tuam
Year of birth unknown